Hadi Asghari (born 12 May 1981) is an Iranian football striker who currently plays for Shahrdari Urmia F.C. in the Iran Football's 2nd Division. He became the top goalscorer in Iran Pro League in 2007–08 season along with Mohsen Khalili.

Club career
He became the top scorer of the league in 2007–08 season with Mohsen Khalili with 18 goals and moved to Sepahan from Rah Ahan under Amir Ghalenoei management in summer 2008 but had a difficult season where he was mostly used as the substitute and moved for the 2009–10 season to Pas. He had a good performance in Pas, where he played in most of games starting in 27 games and scored 10 goals.

Club career statistics
Last Update  16 November 2012

International career
He was called to Team Melli after his success in 2007–08 and becoming the top scorer of the league but could not feature in any match.

External links
Persian League Profile 

Living people
People from Salmas
1981 births
Iranian footballers
Persian Gulf Pro League players
Azadegan League players
Rah Ahan players
Sepahan S.C. footballers
Association football forwards
Saba players